Keyser Brook is a river in Delaware County, New York and Otsego County, New York. It flows into Charlotte Creek east-northeast of Davenport.

References

Rivers of New York (state)
Rivers of Delaware County, New York
Rivers of Otsego County, New York